HMS Myrtle was an  sloop that was part of a Royal Navy squadron that was sent to assist the Baltic States and their fight for independence. While clearing naval mines on 16 July 1919 both Myrtle and  hit mines and sank. The two blasts killed nine sailors.

Design and construction
The Azalea class was based on the previous , but with a heavier gun armament. They were designed at the start of the First World War as relatively fast minesweepers that could also carry out various miscellaneous duties in support of the fleet such as acting as dispatch vessels or carrying out towing operations, but as the war continued and the threat from German submarines grew, became increasingly involved in anti-submarine duties.

Displacement was  normal. The Azeleas had a main armament of two 4.7-inch (120 mm) or 4-inch (102 mm) guns, with two 3-pounder (47 mm) anti-aircraft guns also carried. Myrtle had a crew of 90 officers and other ranks.

Myrtle was ordered on 4 May 1915 from the Scottish shipbuilder Lobnitz, and was built at their Renfrew shipyard as yard number 806. She was launched on 11 October 1915, and was completed on 16 December 1915.

Service
On commissioning, Myrtle was attached to the Grand Fleet. The duties of the sloops attached to the Grand Fleet were mainly confined to keeping the approaches to the Fleet's anchorage at Scapa Flow clear of mines, with daily sweeping of the prescribed channels. By July 1916, the Grand Fleet's minesweepers had been split into three Flotillas, with Myrtle joining the 1st Fleetsweeping Flotilla. Myrtle was still part of the 1st Minesweeping Flotilla, by now based at Granton, Edinburgh at the end of the war in November 1918.

Baltic deployment and loss
The British campaign in the Baltic was a part of the Allied intervention in the Russian Civil War. The codename of the Royal Navy campaign was "Operation Red Trek".  The intervention played a key role in enabling the establishment of the independent states of Estonia and Latvia but failed to secure the control of Petrograd by White Russian forces, which was one of the main goals of the campaign. The taskforce was vital in supplying the Baltic states as well as containing the Soviet navies.

On 26 June 1919, the 1st Fleet Sweeping Flotilla arrived at Biorko to reinforce the British forces in the Baltic. During the afternoon, Myrtle and Gentian were attempting to sink mines that had been brought to the surface by Lilac and Lupins sweep when Gentian struck an unswept mine. Myrtle went to Gentians assistance, but also stuck a mine, which broke off the fore part of the ship and killed six. Myrtle sank 90 minutes after striking the mine. Myrtles commanding officer, Lieutenant Commander Richard Scott, was awarded the Bronze Albert Medal for Lifesaving for his actions during the sinking, returning alone to the ship to search it for a missing man.

Wreck

Notes

References

Bibliography
 
 
 
 
 
   

  
   
  
 

 

Maritime incidents in 1919
Shipwrecks in the Baltic Sea
Ships sunk by mines
Azalea-class sloops
1915 ships